Graham Frederick Anthony Harding (19 March 1937 – 20 October 2018) of Aston University was the first professor of clinical neurophysiology in the United Kingdom. He was the first to recognise that television broadcasts and video games could trigger epilepsy.

References

Further reading
 

1937 births
2018 deaths
Academics of Aston University
Neurophysiologists
Alumni of the University of Birmingham
Alumni of University College London
Epilepsy